Varun Grover (born 1959) is an American Information systems researcher, who is the David D. Glass Endowed Chair and Distinguished Professor at the Walton School of Business, University of Arkansas.  From 2002-17, he was the William S. Lee (Duke Energy) Distinguished Professor of Information Systems at Clemson University, where he taught doctoral seminars on methods and information systems. He is consistently in the top 3 IS researchers in the world (ranked by volume in top journals). He has an h-index of 97, among the top 5 in his field Dr. Grover has more than 45,000 citations in Google Scholar and over 10,000 citations in Web of Science.

Biography 
Grover has received his B.Tech. in Electrical Engineering in 1982 from the Indian Institute of Technology Delhi, his MBA in 1985 from Southern Illinois University, and his Ph.D. in Management Information Systems in 1990 from the University of Pittsburgh.

After his graduation in New Delhi, Grover started as Marketing Analyst in 1982-83. Next in the United States he was Graduate Research Assistant at the Southern Illinois University from 1983 to 1985, and at the Katz Graduate School of Business of the University of Pittsburgh from 1985 to 1988. After another year as lecturer at Pitt he moved to the University of South Carolina, where he became Assistant Professor, in 1994 Associate Professor, and from 1998 to 2001 Full Professor (BPF Professor and Distinguished Researcher). From 2002-17 he was the William S. Lee (Duke Energy) Chaired Full Professor at the  College of Business & Behavioral Sciences of the Clemson University.

Currently, Dr. Grover is the David D. Glass Endowed Chair and Distinguished Professor of IS at the Walton College of Business, University of Arkansas. He is Senior Editor for MISQ Executive, Editor of the Journal of the Association for Information Systems Section on Path Breaking Research, and has served as Senior Editor for MIS Quarterly (2 terms), the Journal of the AIS (2 terms), and Database. He is also current or former Associate/Advisory Editor of 15 other journals including the Journal of MIS, Decision Sciences, Information Systems Research, and Information Systems Journal.

Grover is married.  His interests include tennis, world travel, and home electronics. He is a deeply loyal fan of the Pittsburgh Steelers NFL team.

Research
Grover's research interests include IS value, IS strategy, e-business, KM, reengineering, innovation, the effect of IT on the individual in influencing identity and stress, and introspective work on the IS field and its welfare. While his work employs a positivist epistemology, it is not locked into one philosophy or even methodology. He have conducted field surveys, experimental designs, structured interviews, content analysis, secondary data analyses (e.g., strategic group analysis, event studies), field experiments, and modeling. Most of his work has been published in major refereed journals and he recently co-edited three books on IT and process change. He have received a number of research awards and have been consistently recognized as the 1st, 2nd, or 3rd most productive researcher in widely recognized major (A level) IS journals (e.g., MIS Quarterly, Journal of MIS, Information Systems Research) in ten independent published studies and the 2nd most influential researcher based on citation impact in a recent study. Since 1990, he is the 2nd most published researcher in the prestigious AIS “Basket of 6” journals. He have also participated in various prominent roles in national conferences (e.g., ICIS, DSI, AIS) and is involved in leadership roles (e.g., Senior Editorship) in numerous premier journals.

Publications 
Grover has integrated information systems and operations management research to produce valuable contributions to both fields. Notable peer-reviewed articles authored/co-authored by Dr. Grover include:

 
 
 
 
 
 
 
 
 
 
 
 
 
 

In addition to his numerous research articles and book chapters, he has co-authored three books:
 With M. Lynne Markus, Business Process Transformation, Sharpe Publishing Company (Part of the Advances in Management Information Systems Series), Armonk, NY, 2008
 With W.R. Kettinger, ProcessThink: Winning Perspectives for Business Change in the Information Age, Idea Group Publishing, Hershey, PA and London, UK, 2000 (399 pages) 
 With W.R. Kettinger, Business Process Change: Concepts, Methods and Technologies, IDEA Group Publishing, Harrisburg, USA, 1995 (704 pages)

Recognition 
Grover's honors include "AIS LEO Awards", which was announced at the International Conference on Information Systems in year 2020. The LEO Award recipients are recognized for their outstanding contribution and global impact within the Information Systems fields and outside the field. He was also awarded Outstanding Faculty Member at the University of Arkansas for “achievement in student engagement, scholarship and research, innovation, and leadership development in 2020. In 2019, he was awarded AIS Distinguished Member Cum Laude at ICIS 2019 in Munich; he was recognized as most published and most cited authors in the DATABASE for Advances in Information Systems,; and he was ranked in the top 5 of AIS Scholars in the 2019 update of the University of Arizona's h-index ranking with a h-index of 85.

In 2018, he received "Best Published Paper Award" in the Organizational Communications and Information Systems (OCIS) Division of the Academy of Management for paper (with K. Lyytinen), "Management Misinformation Systems: A Time to Revist," which was published in the Journal of the Association for Information Systems. In 2017, he was recognized in the top 5 of 400 prominent Management Information Systems (MIS) researchers in the 2017 update of the University of Arizona's h-index ranking. In 2013, he was listed among Highly Cited Researchers from Thomson Reuters and received "Excellence in Graduate Teaching Award: from College of Business & Behavioral Sciences, Clemson University (and 2004).

In 2012, he was selected for 2012 Edition of Who's Who in America; he received "Alumni Award for Outstanding Achievement in Research" which is Clemson University's highest honor for research and Clemson University Board of Trustees "Award for Faculty Excellence". In 2010, he received "AIS Fellow Award" for his "outstanding contributions to the information systems discipline in terms of research, teaching and service". He received the Leadership Development Award from the Global Information Technology Management Association in 2008 and 2011. He received Award for Faculty Excellence from Clemson University Board of Trustees in both 2009 and 2010. He was recognized by PricewaterhouseCoopers "Outsourcing World Achievement Award" in 1999 and 2000. In 1998, he was listed in the 1998 Edition of "International Who's Who in Information Technology". He was selected and listed in "Who's Who of International Professionals" in 1997.

References

External links
 Varun Grover at varungrover.com

1959 births
Living people
American computer scientists
Information systems researchers
Clemson University faculty